The following lists events that happened during 1953 in South Africa.

Incumbents
 Monarch: Queen Elizabeth II.
 Governor-General and High Commissioner for Southern Africa: Ernest George Jansen.
 Prime Minister: Daniel François Malan.
 Chief Justice: Albert van der Sandt Centlivres.

Events

May
 9 – The Liberal Party of South Africa is formed in Cape Town by Alan Paton.

July
 29 – Santam Insurance Company is registered, following the separation of trust and insurance operations.

September
 Mimi Coertse leaves South Africa for London.

December
 18–20 – The 42nd Annual Conference of the African National Congress takes place in Queenstown.

Unknown date
 The Communist Party of South Africa (CPSA), banned by the National Party government, relaunches itself underground as the South African Communist Party (SACP).
 Bantu Education Act is voted, and will start 1 January 1954.

Births
 12 January – Steven De Groote, classical pianist. (d. 1989)
 13 January – Derek Hanekom, activist and politician.
 15 February – Mantfombi Dlamini, Queen Consort of the Zulu Nation. (d. 2021)
 5 March – Tokyo Sexwale, businessman, politician and activist.
 29 April – Bill Drummond, British musician
 22 October – Loyiso Nongxa, mathematician.
 7 December – Naledi Pandor, national minister

Deaths
 1 July – Totius, Afrikaans poet. (b. 1877)

Railways

Railway lines opened
 14 October – Cape – Lohatla to Sishen, .

Locomotives
Two new Cape gauge locomotive types enter service on the South African Railways (SAR):
 The first of ninety Class 25 4-8-4 Northern type condensing steam locomotives.
 The first of fifty Class 25NC non-condensing versions of the Class 25 Condenser.

Sports

Football
 22 November – In a friendly match the South Africa national football team loses 1–3 to the Portugal national football team at the National Stadium, Lisbon, Portugal.

References

History of South Africa